All Yours is the seventh studio album by the Japanese singer Crystal Kay, released by Epic Records Japan, on June 20, 2007.

First editions included a DVD section, with the three music videos from the album's singles, as well as "Konna ni Chikaku de..." performed live for a special Nodame orchestra concert at the Tokyo International Forum on February 28, 2007. All Yours was re-released as a "Winter Special Package" in November 2007 with a new cover.

It is her only number-one album and has been certified gold by the RIAJ for shipments of over 100,000 copies in Japan.

Track listing

Charts

Certifications

Release history

References

2007 albums
Crystal Kay albums
Epic Records albums